Thomé H. Fang (1899–1977) was a Chinese philosopher. He was described by Charles A. Moore as the "greatest philosopher of China" and by Vincent Shen as "one of the most creative contemporary Chinese philosophers."

Biography 
Thomé H. Fang was born on 9 February 1899 (according to the Lunar Calendar) of a family in Tong Cheng, An-hui, China, that was known for producing prominent scholars, thinkers, and men of letters in Chinese classics, including several Royal Tutors at the Imperial Palace during the Ming and Qing Dynasties (such as Fang Gongcheng, Fang Guancheng, etc.). Thomé H. Fang was the 16th generation descendant of Fang Bao, a Qing dynasty scholar and one of the founders of the Tongcheng School, and a relative of his contemporary Fang Chih, a Chinese diplomat. He was taught the Chinese classics while he was young, and later studied at Jinlin University in Nanjing, where he took courses from John Dewey on ancient Western philosophy. He attended the University of Wisconsin, Madison, and completed an MA in philosophy and pursued a doctorate comparing British and American realism.

From 1925 to 1948, Thomé H. Fang taught at several universities in China, mostly at the National Central University (later renamed Nanjing University and reinstated in Taiwan), in Nanking and Chungking. Then he taught at National Taiwan University.

Works 
 Chinese Philosophy: Its Spirit and Its Development, Linking Publishing Co., Ltd, Taipei, 1981, 1986
 The Chinese View of Life: The Philosophy of Comprehensive Harmony, Linking Publishing Co., Ltd., Taipei, 1980, 1981, 1986
 Creativity in Man and Nature: A Collection of Philosophical Essays, Linking Publishing Co., Ltd., Taipei, 1980, 1983
 Chinese Philosophy:Its Spirit and Its Development, Linking Publishing Co., Ltd., Taipei, 1981, 1981, 1986
 Philosophy of Life, Creativity, and Inclusiveness,
 Three Types of Philosophical Wisdom (Zhexue san hui-哲學三慧), 重慶版時事新報學燈,26 June 1983.
 Primordial Confucianism and Taoism (Yuan Shi Ru Jia Dao Jia Zhe Xue-原始儒家道家哲學), Taipei, 1983.
 Chinese Mahayana Buddhism (Chung Guo Da Zheng Fo Xue-中國大乘佛學), Taipei, 1984.
 Neo-Confucianism in Sung, Ming and Ch'ing Periods (Xin Ru Jia Zhe Xue shipa jiang-新儒家哲學十八講)), Taipei, 1983.

References

External links 
Thomé H. Fang Institute: articles of Thomé H. Fang

20th-century Chinese philosophers
Chinese Confucianists
University of Nanking alumni
Academic staff of the National Central University
Academic staff of the National Taiwan University
Taiwanese philosophers
1899 births
1977 deaths
People from Tongcheng, Anhui
Educators from Anhui
Taiwanese educators
Republic of China philosophers
Philosophers from Anhui
Chinese spiritual writers
Taiwanese writers
Republic of China essayists
Writers from Anhui
Taiwanese people from Anhui
20th-century essayists